Cryptoniesslia is a genus of fungi within the Niessliaceae family. This is a monotypic genus, containing the single species Cryptoniesslia setulosa.

References

External links
Cryptoniesslia at Index Fungorum

Niessliaceae
Monotypic Sordariomycetes genera